Bình Gia is a rural district of Lạng Sơn province in the Northeast region of Vietnam. As of 2003, the district had a population of 54,349. The district covers an area of 1,091 km2. The district capital lies at Bình Gia.

Administrative divisions
Bình Gia, Tô Hiệu, Hoàng Văn Thụ, Tân Văn, Hồng Thái, Mông Ân, Hồng Phong, Thiện Hòa, Thiện Long, Thiện Thuật,  Yên Lỗ, Hưng Đạo, Hoa Thám, Bình La, Minh Khai, Quang Trung, Quý Hòa, Tân Hòa, Hòa Bình, Vĩnh Yên.

References

Districts of Lạng Sơn province
Lạng Sơn province